Thomas or Tom Hickey may refer to:

Tom Hickey (actor) (1944–2021), Irish actor
Tom "Bo" Hickey (born 1945), American football player who played for the Denver Broncos
Tom Hickey (footballer, born 1901) (1901–1935), Australian rules footballer who played for Fitzroy
Tom Hickey (footballer, born 1991), Australian rules footballer who plays for Sydney (formerly for Gold Coast, St Kilda and West Coast)
Tom Hickey (hurler) (born 1975), Irish hurler
Tom Hickey (politician) (1933–2020), politician in Newfoundland, Canada
Thomas Hickey (ice hockey) (born 1989), Canadian professional ice hockey defenceman
Thomas Hickey (painter) (1741–1824), Irish painter
Thomas Hickey (soldier) (died 1776), executed for mutiny during the American Revolution
Thomas J. Hickey (1930–2016), American politician in Nevada
Thomas Francis Hickey (bishop) (1861–1940), Roman Catholic Bishop of Rochester
Thomas Francis Hickey (general) (1898–1983), United States Army Lieutenant General
Thomas "TJ" Hickey,  Australian Aboriginal teenager whose death led to the 2004 Redfern riots